Xichang Station, formerly Dongfeng Road West Station during planning, is a station on Line 5 of the Guangzhou Metro. It is located under the junction of Huanshi Road West and Dongfeng Road West in the Liwan District of Guangzhou. Huanshi Road West is the main shopping area for shoes in the city. The station opened on 28December 2009.

Station layout

Exits

References

External links

Railway stations in China opened in 2009
Guangzhou Metro stations in Liwan District